Orby Shipley (July 1, 1832 - July 5, 1916) was an English clergyman, editor, liturgist, translator, publisher, and hymn-writer. An Anglo-Catholic convert to Roman Catholicism from the Church of England, he had been a priest of the Society of the Holy Cross before his conversion. Shipley served at St Thomas the Martyr's Church, Oxford and St Alban's Church, Holborn as an Anglican priest. Shipley and his wife became Roman Catholics in 1878.

Works 
Eucharistic Litanies from Ancient Sources 1860
Lyra Eucharistica: Hymns and Verses on the Holy Communion, Ancient and Modern with Other Poems 1864
Lyra Mystica: Hymns and Verses on Sacred Subjects, Ancient and Modern 1865
Six Short Sermons on Sin: Lent Lectures at S. Alban the Martyr, Holborn 1868
Of the Establishment of an Oratory in London by the Society of the Holy Cross 1870
Carmina Mariana: An English Anthology in Verse in Honour of or in Relation to the Blessed Virgin Mary 1893

See also 
Chiswick Press

External links 
 Bibliographic directory from Project Canterbury

1832 births
1916 deaths
19th-century English Anglican priests
English Anglo-Catholics
Anglican priest converts to Roman Catholicism
Anglo-Catholic clergy
Anglo-Catholic writers
Christian hymnwriters